DZET-TV, Channel 28 (analog) and Channel 51 (digital), is a commercial television station owned and operated by TV5 Network, Inc. Its studio is located at Camp 7, Monticello Road, Baguio, while its transmitter is located at Mt. Sto. Tomas, Tuba, Benguet.

History
1967 - ABC Baguio was first aired on Channel 8 (DZXX-TV), the first television station in the whole Cordillera was launched by Associated Broadcasting Corporation until President of the Philippines Ferdinand Marcos declared Martial Law in 1972.
July 5, 1993 - the station was opened by the Associated Broadcasting Company, along with the callsign as DZET-TV and switched its frequency from VHF Channel 8 to UHF Channel 28.
December 9, 1994 - ABC TV stations acquired a new franchise to operate under Republic Act 7831 signed by President Fidel V. Ramos (FVR). In the same year, the station went on nationwide satellite broadcasting. In a phenomenal growth, ABC Baguio earned its reputation as "The Fastest Growing Network" under new network executive Tina Monzon-Palma who served as Chief Operating Officer.
August 8, 2008 - The station aired a countdown to its re-launch for much of the next day until 19:00 PHT, when the network officially re-launched under its new name of TV5.
2013 - TV5 Baguio was relaunched and upgraded its transmitting power to 30,480 watts (113.44 kW ERP) that covers the whole North Luzon region.
February 17, 2018 - as the recent changes within the network and in celebration of its 10th anniversary, TV5 Baguio was relaunched as The 5 Network with a new logo and station ID entitled Get it on 5, whereas the TV on the northeastern quadrant of the logo has been dropped, making it more flexible for the other divisions to use it as part of their own identity.
January 13, 2019 - 5 Baguio introduced a variation of the current numerical 5 logo, similar to the newly network, 5 Plus.
August 15, 2020 - 5 Baguio was reverted to TV5 while retaining the 2019 numerical 5 logo.
August 22, 2021 - TV5 Baguio began digital test broadcasts on UHF Channel 51.

Digital television

Digital channels

UHF Channel 51 (695.143 MHz)

Areas of coverage

Primary areas 
 Baguio 
 Benguet
 Dagupan
 Pangasinan
 La Union

Secondary areas 
 Nueva Ecija
 Portion of Tarlac
 Portion of Ilocos Sur
 Portion of Bulacan
 Portion of Pampanga

References

See also
 TV5
 List of TV5 Stations
 Radyo5 102.3 News FM Baguio

TV5 (Philippine TV network) stations
Television channels and stations established in 1993
1993 establishments in the Philippines
Television stations in Baguio
Digital television stations in the Philippines